A neighbourhood policing team (NPT), also sometimes known as safer neighbourhood team (SNT), is   a small team of police officers and police community support officers (usually 3-10 strong) who are dedicated to policing a certain community or area. 

It is a concept developed by the police of the United Kingdom.
, there are 3,600 NPTs throughout the United Kingdom.

This type of policing is designed to make the police more visible, reduce fear and aid interaction between the public and the police, and it aids in local knowledge, gaining intelligence and tip-offs from the public. 

NPTs are led by a police officer, usually of sergeant or inspector rank, and may include police community support officers, special constables, local council staff and members of voluntary organisations, such as a neighbourhood watch.

See also
Community policing
Community Beat Manager
Police patrol
Police area
The Policing Pledge
Neighbourhood Policing Plan
Neighbourhood police centre (Singapore)
Neighborhood watch

References

External links
National Police Improvement Agency - Neighbourhood Policing
USPA Security

Law enforcement in the United Kingdom
Law enforcement techniques
Crime prevention